Football Club Kerala is an Indian professional football club based in Thrissur, Kerala. The club made its debut in national level football through the I-League 2nd Division in 2017–18. They also compete in the Kerala Premier League.

Name
FC Kerala is a crowd-funded venture that started in 2014 with aim of reaching out to football fans in the state better than predecessors who hit financial crisis. The name FC Kerala was set up to make it Kerala's own club. Narayana Menon, CEO of the club said that its main aim is to become Football team of the people.

History
FC Kerala, formed in 2014, began its journey by playing in Kerala Premier League, a professional league organised by Kerala Football Association. 
After three years, the club made its debut in I-League 2nd Division. FC Kerala claimed victory in the first match after overcoming Fateh Hyderabad 2–1.

In the 2019–20 2nd Division League, FC Kerala played 7 matches in group C and earned 9 points, but later pulled out to financial crisis. In December 2022, the club participated in Dausa Gold Cup in Rajasthan, in which they won title with 1–0 win over I-League side Rajasthan United in final.

Kit manufacturers and shirt sponsors

Stadium

FC Kerala uses the Thrissur Municipal Corporation Stadium as their home ground. It has artificial turf and seating capacity of 15,000 spectators. Opened in 1978, it is commonly known as Palace Stadium or TMC Stadium.

Supporters

A recognised Thrissur-based fan club by the name Red Warriors has been in support since 2017. The Municipal Corporation Stadium has seen an average attendance close to 15,000.

Current squad

Current technical staff
As of 20 August 2020

Youth programmes
In 2020, FC Kerala announced that they are opening a residential Football Academy in Thrissur. Currently, the club runs a Soccer School in Thrissur, where close to 800 children, aged between 5 and 20, train under the guidance of India's finest football coaches.

With the launch of Residential Academy, FC Kerala gives the chances to youth players to be associated with the professional way of the FC Kerala family. FC Kerala also aims at personality development of the players thus moulding them as future citizens.

The club's U-13, U-15 and U-18 teams have participated in the respective AIFF Youth I-League tournaments, while the U-9, U-10, & U-11 play in the regional AIFF Baby League tournaments.

The youth teams (various age divisions) of FC Kerala play at the Thrissur Corporation Stadium, St. Alosius School Ground and Sri Kerala Varma College Ground.

See also
 List of football clubs in Kerala

Honours

League
 Kerala Premier League
Semi-final (1): 2018–19

Cup
Dausa Gold Cup
Winners (1): 2022

References

FC Kerala
Association football clubs established in 2014
Football clubs in Kerala
I-League 2nd Division clubs
2014 establishments in Kerala